The Santa Fe And Salt Lake Trail Monument was designated a California Historic Landmark (No.576) on  May 17, 1957. Santa Fe And Salt Lake Trail Monument marks the place two Historic trail merged in Cajon Pass in San Bernardino County, California. The Old Spanish Trail (trade route) and the Mohave Trail-Mojave Road merged in Cajon Pass. The large white marker is just off the Interstate 15 in Cajon Pass, was U.S. Route 66 in the past. It was built by the Pioneer Society of San Bernardino to remember and honor the pioneers that came west. The marker is 12 feet tall and 7 feet square at the base.  Cajon Pass was home to the Serrano Indian, Native Californians that lived in the nearby Atongaibit village, in what is now Hesperia. 

In Summit Valley was the village of Guapiabit, and in Cajon Canyon the village of Amuscopiabit. The pass was used by native in prehistory. The San Andreas Fault runs through and made the  mountain pass between the San Bernardino Mountains and the San Gabriel Mountains in Southern California. One side in the Mojave Desert and the other the Los Angeles Basin.
The Monument is specially dedicated to those that cross the pass on June 20, 1851 as part of the '49s. Sheldon Stoddard and Sydney P. Waite are two of the pioneers that crossed the pass in 1851. They were part of what is now called the Death Valley '49ers that crossed the pass after surviving a wrong detour though Death Valley in 1949. In addition to building the monument, the Pioneer Society of San Bernardino built a log cabin, picnic tables and benches in the mountains and San Bernardino for the public to use.

Monument builders
The names of the Pioneer Society of San Bernardino members that built the monument in 1917 are on the monument: Sheldon Stoddard, Sydney P. Waite, John Brown, Jr., George Miller, George M. Cooley, Silas C. Cox, Richard Weir, and Jasper N. Corbett.

Sheldon Stoddard (February 8. 1830– ) Survived the 1849 trip to California. Was a pioneer of San Bernardino. Cross the Mojave Desert a few more times.
 Sydney P. Waite: Survived the 1849 trip to California. Became lifelong friends with Sheldon Stoddard on the trip west. With Stoddard took wagon apart so they could be take over the rocky rough trip over Cajon Pass. Moved to near the San Gabirel Mission. Waite purchased the Los Angeles Star. Became the first postmaster. Moved to San Bernardino in 1858.
John Brown, Jr.: A pioneer of San Bernardino and a lawyer in San Bernardino. In 1872 John Brown made a quality pack trail toll (turnpike) road through Cajon Pass with dynamite. He fail to keep up the road and his partner John J. Driggers was taking to court in 1875, in Driggers v Lane. Secretary of the Pioneer Society of San Bernardino, planned the dedication. After Brown toll road land agreement ended, the county built an automobile road in 1915. This was part of the National Old Trails Road. In the great flood of 1938 it was washed away.
George Miller: Wrote a book about the trip A Trip to Death Valley" in 1919. This is about his 1869 trip to Death Valley.
 George M. Cooley: Pioneer of San Bernardino, opened a hardware store: Cooley-Betterly Hardware. He sold the store in 1925.
 Silas C. Cox: President of Pioneer Society of San Bernardino, planned the dedication.
Richard Weir: Active in the Pioneer Society of San Bernardino. Died in San Bernardino in April 1932.
Jasper N. Corbett (Jap Corbett), Came to California in 1856. Pioneer of San Bernardino, prospector. Born in 1843 in Jackson County, Indiana. Worked on the old Moses Daley ranch. Married Miss Adelaide Daley. Active in the Pioneer Society of San Bernardino.

Stoddard-Waite Monument
The Stoddard-Waite Monument was designated a California Historic Landmark (No.578) on  May 17, 1957. Stoddard-Waite Monument marks the place Sheldon Stoddard and Sydney P. Waite crossed the Cajon Pass in 1851. Stoddard and Waite built the Monument in 1912. A large dedication ceremony was held on May 18, 1913. The Marker was in the Elsie Arey May Nature Center, south of the I-15, on Cleghorn Road and is 16 miles North of San Bernardino on a dirt road. The Monument is now on private land. Located at: 34.303533 -117.466617.mojavedesertarchives Stoddard-Waite MonumentCity of San Bernardino Historical and Pioneer Society, Stoddard-Waite Monument, July 2013 By Richard D. Thompson, Libraria

Dedication May 18, 1913

At the dedication on May 18, 1913:

 Sheldon Stoddard at the age of 83 years. He had crossed the pass 60 years early as one of the original pioneers with his family.
 Sydney P. Waite a survivor of the Death Valley 1849 trip.
 Capt. Jefferson Hunt who made three trips over the pass one in 1847, second in 1849 and last in 1851.
 Mrs. (Nancy) Edward Daley, daughter of Capt. Hunt.
 Hattie Irene Knight unveiled the monument, she was the great-granddaughter of Sheldon Stoddard.
 Other original '49 pioneers: Mrs. Nancy Daley, Sarah A. Rathbun and Justis Morse.
Several hundred old pioneers.
 Federal Judge Benjamin Franklin Bledsoe gave the address.
 Judge J. W. Curtis, a grandson of Rev. I. C. Curtis, who came through the Pass in the early '60s spoke.
 Judge Rex B. Goodceli, grandfather came through the Pass in 1857, spoke.
 Attorney Grant Holcomb, grandson of pioneer William F. Holcomb, who came to San Bernardino in 1860 and discovered gold in Big Bear and Holcomb Valley.
 Pioneer William Stephen.
 Attorney R. E. Swing.
 R.T. Roberds, Mary Crandall, ane Smithson, Jane Smithson and George Miller shared their crossing story.
 Pablo Belarde crossed in 1844 by a pack mule with New Mexico blankets, shared.
 Reverend Mark B. Shaw gave the invocation.
 Mary Harris managed the American flags on site.
 Also sharing was De La Montaigne Woodward, Henry M. Willis, Judge Benjamin F. Bledsoe, W.J. Curtis and Joseph E. Rich.
History Of San Bernardino And Riverside Counties, Jhohn Brown, Jr. Editor For San Bernardino County And James Boyd, Editor For Riverside County

Rededication May 18, 2013
Stoddard-Waite monument was rededicated for its 100-year anniversary, by the San Bernardino Historical and Pioneer Society on May 18, 2013. The Stoddard and Waite families talked about there families past. Along with the rededication, the group walked to other historical sites, like on the old toll road to bridge piers for Crowder Canyon. Also talked about the history of the Inman Ranch. President Steve Shaw opened and gave a slide show “Old Pioneer Society,” Mike Hartless with the San Bernardino County Museum Association shared abouthe Indian village.

Markers
California Historical Landmark Marker #576 at the Santa Fe And Salt Lake Trail pass site reads: Santa Fe And Salt Lake Trail 1849, Erected in honor of the brave pioneers of California, in 1917 by Sheldon Stoddard, Sydney P. Waite, John Brown, Jr., George Miller, George M. Cooley, Silas C. Cox, Richard Weir, and Jasper N. Corbett.Marker Database, Santa Fe and Salt Lake Trail Monument

The Stoddard-Waite Monument at the Elsie Arey May Nature Center, California Historical Landmark #578, reads:Sheldon Stoddard, Sydney P. Waite came over this trail in 1849 helped erect this monument in 1912.
The California Historical Landmark book reports: 
This monument marks the western extension of the Santa Fe Trail traveled by Sheldon Stoddard and Sydney P. Waite in 1849.

Elsie Arey May Nature Center
San Bernardino County's Elsie Arey May Nature Center was on the Pacific Crest Trail in Southern California's Cajon Pass. Elsie Arey May was teacher in San Bernardino County and helped at the San Bernardino County museum, as a member of the Museum Association.

See also
Jedediah Smith
Henry Wade Exit Route
California Historical Landmarks in San Bernardino County, California
Westward Expansion Trails
Mormon Trail Monument

References

External links

 A photographic report of Tehachapi and Cajon Pass (May, 2012) 

California Gold Rush
History of Southern California
Mojave Desert
California Historical Landmarks
History of San Bernardino, California